Capillostrongyloides is a genus of nematodes belonging to the family Capillariidae.

The species of this genus are found in Central America.

Species:

Capillostrongyloides arapaimae 
Capillostrongyloides congiopodi 
Capillostrongyloides norvegica 
Capillostrongyloides physiculi 
Capillostrongyloides tasmanica

References

Nematodes